National Route 288 is a national highway of Japan, connecting Kōriyama, Fukushima and Futaba, Fukushima in Japan, with a total length of 68.3 km (42.44 mi).

References

National highways in Japan
Roads in Fukushima Prefecture